Lillian Lehman is an American actress.

The daughter of a Lutheran minister, Lehman was born in Oak Hill, Alabama, but moved with her family to Buffalo, New York, when she was five years old. She was named actress of the year while she attended Kent State University.

Lehman played Lena Hart in NBC's soap opera Sunset Beach, nurse Carol Williams on Emergency!, Letty Gilmore on Fay, Ruth Tenafly on Tenafly, and Dr. Joyce Meadows on ABC's General Hospital. She has also been cast in various guest roles on TV,

Lehman is a professor emerita of theatre and graduate of California State University, Northridge with a B.A. in theatre.

She has also acted in films, such as Defending Your Life and Evan Almighty. TV credits include Magnum P.I., General Hospital, ER, Cold Case, Seinfeld, Married... with Children, a recurring role as Judge Mary Harcourt on L.A. Law, a recurring role as Judge Tiano on The Closer and numerous other judge roles in The Division, Sparks, JAG, The Wayans Bros., Gabriel's Fire, Alfred Hitchcock Presents and others.

Personal life
Lehman was married briefly to actor John Amos.

References

External links
 

Actresses from Alabama
Actresses from New York (state)
African-American actresses
American film actresses
American television actresses
California State University, Northridge alumni
California State University, Northridge faculty
Living people
People from Buffalo, New York
People from Selma, Alabama
21st-century African-American people
21st-century African-American women
20th-century African-American people
20th-century African-American women
Year of birth missing (living people)